Lionel Duroy de Suduiraut (born 1 October 1949) is a French writer and journalist born in Bizerte (Tunisia) into an impoverished family of aristocratic origin who long shared extreme right-wing ideas. His youth in this environment left a profound mark on him and was the breeding ground for many of his books. (Le Chagrin).
Since the publication of his first novel in 1990, he has devoted himself entirely to writing novels with an essentially autobiographical content. He is happy to talk about his mother, the family trauma linked to his father's war wounds and the legal expulsion of his family from their home in 1955 - following a lack of solidarity from the rest of the family.

He is a ghost-writer for many celebrities who wish to publish their autobiographies.

In 2013, his novel L'Hiver des hommes made him the winner of the prix Renaudot des lycéens 2012 and the Prix Joseph-Kessel 2013.

Works 
 
 
 
 
 
 
 
 
 
 
 
 
 
  –  2010, Grand prix Marie Claire du roman d'émotion 2010, Prix Marcel Pagnol 2010
 
 
 
 - Prix Renaudot des Lycéens 2012
 - Prix Joseph-Kessel 2013
 
 Échapper, Paris, Julliard, 2015, 277 p. 
 L’Absente, Paris, Julliard, 2016, 360 p. 
 Eugenia, Paris, Julliard, 2018, 394 p.

In collaboration 
 
 
 
  (Prix spécial du Jury Prix Vérité), 2007

References

External links 

 Lionel Duroy on France Inter
  Lionel Duroy : les mots qui tuent on Paris Match

20th-century French journalists
20th-century French writers
21st-century French writers
20th-century French novelists
21st-century French essayists
Ghostwriters
Joseph Kessel Prize recipients
Prix Renaudot des lycéens winners
1949 births
Living people
People from Bizerte